Lamberticeras is an extinct ammonite genus belonging to the family Cardioceratidae.

These fast-moving nektonic carnivores lived during the Jurassic period, in the upper Callovian age.

References

Jurassic ammonites
Ammonitida genera
Stephanoceratoidea